Marina Tetarić Prusec is a Croatian film director.

Born in Zagreb, Croatia. She graduated from Drama, Film and Television Academy in Zagreb – film and television directing (mentor: Oscar Winner Dušan Vukotić). She also studied sociology in Faculty of Philosophy in Zagreb.

Two times she won prizes for screenplays (in the competitions) in Sarajevo, so she went there and directed two films.
 
A few years she directs a series of documentary and documentary-feature films for the Croatian National Television. She is developing not only in writing screenplays and in directing, but also in organization and in production of all kinds of forms (she created short forms, commercial spots, documentaries and features).

A few years she works in the Ministry of Defense RH – in Public Relations Department which includes film-TV studio. There she works as civil person in developing production of different forms: documentaries, documentary-features, spots, clips, coverages. She works as director, writer, in organization and in presentation production in public.

She acquired international experience several times – in 2001 and 2003 she went to Rome in Italy, where she presents Croatia at the International Film Festival Eserciti e Popoli. There, in 2001 for her documentary „Under The Horizon“ she won First prize for the best film in its category (in competition of 70 countries from all over the world).

Last few years she works in the independent productions.

For directing film "Tunnel", she received the Silver Award at So You Think You Can Act, a competition exclusively targeted to recognize the talent of directors and actors from around the world, USA, 2019.
 
With the same she entered the Official Selection of The Hollywood First-Time Filmmaker Showcase, 2020, and also the New York Lift-Off Film Festival, 2021.

Her screenplays for feature films are at the top of film festivals in the USA, Russia and India:
        
"Wild Time" is selected in Top 10 finalists at the European International Film Festival in St. Petersburg, Russia, 2019 (in competition of more than 600 projects from all the world), and also is nominated at Jaipur IFF, India, 2020.
 
"Superincognito" is selected into the Official Selection of Film Festival LA Under the Stars, Los Angeles, 2020 (in competition of more than 1500 submissions from worldwide), and also is nominated at New Delhi Film Festival-NDFF, India, 2021. 

SF "Connection" won as Best Treatment at the Script and Storyboard Showcase, Los Angeles, 2020.
 
"Flyby" is the finalist of the European International Film Festival in St. Petersburg, Russia, 2020 (in competition of more than 800 projects from worldwide), and also is selected in Top 7 finalists of the Film Festival Hollywood Art and Movie Awards, 2021.
 
"The Smile" is nominated at International Screenplay Competition ISC@JIFF (Mind to Audience), Jaipur, India, 2021, and also is selected in Top 10 finalists of Film Festival LA Under the Stars, Los Angeles, 2021 (in competition of more than 1000 submissions from worldwide).

“Flight to Eternity” won as Best Treatment  at the World Film Carnival, Singapore, 2021.

“Flyby” and “The Smile” entered the Hot 100 Best Screenplays at the Capital Fund Screenplay Competition, LA, 2021. 

At invitation of the festival organizers, she participated in a script panel at the Hollywood Art and Movie Awards, 2021.

For directing film "Flight of the Sky Masters" she received the Exceptional Merit Award at the Nature Without Borders film festival, USA, 2022.

For the third time, she entered the prestigious list of Hot 100 Best Screenplays, this time with the project "Range", at the Capital Fund SC, LA, 2022.

“Wild Time” is the finalist (with Excellence Award), “Flyby” and “The Smile” are semifinalists of the International Screenwriting Competition (between 1846 submissions), New York, 2023.                                                                            
 
She is married, has two sons.

Filmography
DOG, feature film
TIME FOR HUMANITY, documentary-feature film
THE UNUTILISED, feature film
HOMELESS PEOPLE, documentary
FOR PEACE AND LOVE, documentary-feature film
INVALIDS OF WAR, documentary
GOD LIKES ROCK'N'ROLL, TOO, documentary-feature film
LONGING TO RETURN TO BOSNIA, documentary-feature film
DIARY OF A COMBATANT, documentary-feature film
SOS CHILDREN VILLAGE – CROATIA, documentary
INVALIDS OF WAR RETURN HOME, documentary
KRAPINA, BIG SMALL TOWN, documentary
UNDER THE HORIZON, documentary 
TEN, documentary
TUNNEL, documentary
MENU, documentary
FLIGHT OF THE SKY MASTERS, documentary 
HOUSE UNDER THE SUN, serial about architecture
 FARM, docusoap

References

External links
https://filmfreeway.com/MarinaTetaricPrusec
https://www.youtube.com/channel/UCYp-v2i59XFm2tlddLfQq8Q
https://web.archive.org/web/20150402153720/http://www.archive-hr-2014.com/hr/l/2014-08-20_4442385_19/Lions-Club-Vereucha-Virovitica/
http://www.psihijatrija.com/press/
https://web.archive.org/web/20150402092324/http://www.izlog.info/tmp/hcjz/clanak.php?id=13908
http://arhiv.slobodnadalmacija.hr/20021125/kultura01.asp
http://www.hfs.hr/novosti_print.aspx?sif=458
http://hrvatskavirtualnaaviosimulacija.com/forum_old/index.php?topic=165.0
 http://festeuro.ru/finalists/
 https://www.sytyca.com/Pages/Winners_Fall_2019.html
https://www.sytyca.com/Pages/SYTYCA_FAll2019_Selected.html
 http://jiffindia.org/images/JIFF2020_Screenplay_Nominated.pdf
 https://www.launderthestars.com/
 https://www.launderthestars.com/nominees?lightbox=dataItem-k5wq4pzo6
 https://scriptshowcase.wordpress.com/january-2020-selection/
 http://festeuro.ru/finalists-2/
https://hollywoodartandmovieawards.wordpress.com/2021-winners-selection/

http://www.jiffindia.org/images/ISC_JIFF21_Nominated_List.pdf

https://www.facebook.com/launderthestars/photos/pcb.857472088151649/857471924818332/?type=3&theater

https://www.facebook.com/launderthestars/photos/pcb.858590934706431/858590811373110/?type=3&theater

https://hollywoodartandmovieawards.wordpress.com/

http://jiffindia.org/delhi/Nominated_ISCList_NDFF2021_F.pdf

https://worldfilmcarnival.com/monthly-results-april-2021/

https://liftoff.network/new-york/

http://capitalfundscreenplaycompetition.com/screenplay-contest-winners/

https://www.nwbiff.com/NWBIFF_Winners_Summer_2022.html

https://www.facebook.com/InternationalScreenwritingCompetition/

https://nyglamour.net/marina-tetaric-prusec-be-who-you-are-believe-in-yourself-and-never-give-up-also-be-patient/

Croatian film directors
Croatian women film directors
Film people from Zagreb
Living people
Year of birth missing (living people)